Bukit Bintang station may refer to:

 Bukit Bintang Monorail station, part of KL Monorail in Bukit Bintang, sponsored by AirAsia
 Bukit Bintang MRT station, part of Sungai Buloh–Kajang MRT line, sponsored by Pavilion KL